Milton High School (MHS) is a public four-year high school located in Milton, Florida. Milton High School was established in 1915 making it the oldest school in Santa Rosa County.  The original campus was built on Canal Street in Milton, FL and held classes there until it moved to its current location on Stewart Street in 1953.  The original building is now the home to the Santa Rosa County School Board offices.

MHS enrolls over 1,800 students, grades nine through twelve. Milton High has had several principals over its more than 100 years of existence.  Most recently Don Lewis Lynn, Jr. was principal from 1999 to the 2006-07 school year, until taking an Assistant Superintendent position at the county level. Principal Michael Thorpe took over after Buddy Powell and served from 2008 to the 2014-2015 school year. Tim Short became principal in April 2015.

Extracurriculars
Milton Highschool has a multitude of extracurriculars, most notable, the Mighty Black and Gold Marching band, which serves as one of the premier Santa rosa county school marching bands. Milton Highschool also has a Naval Junior Reserve Officer Training Corps, led by Chief Warrant Officer 5 Roberto Fernandez, USMC Ret. and Lieutenant Commander Jefferson Dyer, USN Ret.

History of Milton High School

Carved over the arched doorway of the large, two-story building at 5086 Canal Street is the Latin phrase, "Sit Lux," which means "let the light shine."  This building, now the Santa Rosa County School Board Office, was Milton High School from 1915-1953.

On November 1, 1915, this first state-accredited high school in Santa Rosa County opened its doors for students.  It was organized and financed under the leadership of County Supt John T. Diamond of Jay.  Professor A.D. Keen, a graduate of Emory University, administered the school program along with a self-trained faculty.  This institution was known as the Santa Rosa County High School, as it was then the county's only high school.  As other communities in the county soon added grades or built new high schools, the school in Milton became known as Milton High School.

By 1917, eighty seniors were ready to graduate from Santa Rosa County's first high school.  The 1917 issue of the school yearbook The Phoenix pictures fourteen faculty members, fourteen freshmen, seven sophomores, the girls' basketball team, and the eleven-man baseball team.  The baseball team was coached by Smiley L. Porter.

Notable alumni 
Paul S. Amos, founder and chairman of Aflac
Bolley Johnson, former Speaker of the Florida House of Representatives
Heath Slocum, PGA Tour golfer
 Bubba Watson, PGA Tour golfer
 Boo Weekley, PGA Tour golfer
 Lawrence Tynes, NFL, New York Giants, 2x Super Bowl Champion 2007, 2011
 Cortland Finnegan, NFL, Tennessee Titans (2006-2012), St. Louis Rams (2012-2013), Miami Dolphins 2014, Carolina Panthers 2015
 Elijah Williams, NFL, Atlanta Falcons
 Randy Allen, former professional basketball player.

References

External links 
 

High schools in Santa Rosa County, Florida
Public high schools in Florida
Educational institutions established in 1915
1915 establishments in Florida